Newport Folk Festival is an annual American folk-oriented music festival in Newport, Rhode Island, which began in 1959 as a counterpart to the Newport Jazz Festival. It was one of the first modern music festivals in America, and remains a focal point in the expanding genre of folk music. The festival was held annually from 1959 to 1969, except in 1961 and 1962. In 1985, its founder revived it in Newport, where it has been held at Fort Adams State Park ever since.

History

Founding
The Newport Folk Festival was started in 1959 by George Wein, founder of the already-well-established Newport Jazz Festival, and owner of Storyville, a jazz club located in Boston, Massachusetts. In 1958, Wein became aware of the growing Folk Revival movement and began inviting folk artists such as Odetta to perform on Sunday afternoons at Storyville. The afternoon performances consistently sold out and Wein began to consider the possibility of a "folk afternoon embedded within the 1959 Newport Jazz Festival". Wein envisioned the program to be "similar in scope and tone to the highly successful blues and gospel shows" that had taken place at the Jazz Festival in previous years. Wein asked Odetta, Pete Seeger, and the Weavers to perform on the afternoon in addition to the Kingston Trio.  Some in the jazz community accused Wein of crass commercialism in booking these groups because they deviated from, and had a larger following than, most jazz musicians of the time. This pressure coupled with his various conversations with those in the folk community made it clear to Wein that an afternoon program at the Jazz Festival would not suffice and that there was demand for a full Folk festival.

Aware of his own limitations in the folk scene, Wein asked Albert Grossman, then Odetta's manager, to join him in planning and producing the festival. Grossman accepted and began working with Wein to book talent and organize the weekend. Pete Seeger was also involved with the founding of the festival.

The inaugural festival, held at Freebody Park, included Pete Seeger, Earl Scruggs, the Kingston Trio, John Jacob Niles, Sonny Terry and Brownie McGhee, Odetta, The New Lost City Ramblers, and more. Perhaps the most notable performance was the surprise debut of the eighteen year old Joan Baez, who was brought on as a guest of Bob Gibson.

The festival returned in 1960 and was expanded to include three nights.  The lineup placed an emphasis on music diversity, booking performers from Africa, Scotland, Spain, Israel, and Ireland alongside "traditional" folk musicians such as Pete Seeger, Ewan McColl, John Lee Hooker, Cisco Houston and Tommy Makem.

Civil Rights Movement
In 1962, two young members of the Student Nonviolent Coordinating Committee (SNCC) formed a gospel vocal quartet named the Freedom Singers. And in 1962, Pete and Toshi Seeger assisted the Freedom Singers in organizing a nationwide collegiate tour. As a result, the civil rights movement became deeply embraced by the folk music community. In 1963, the Freedom Singers performed on the first night of the Newport Folk festival, and on the second night Joan Baez joined SNCC activists and roughly 600 festival-goers on a march through Newport. The crowd walked past the Bellevue Avenue mansions and into Touro Park, where SNCC's executive secretary James Forman and Freedom Singers leader Cordell Reagon delivered speeches, rallying support for the March on Washington scheduled for the following March.

For the final performance on Friday Wein had scheduled Peter, Paul and Mary. But under the persuasion of Albert Grossman, who was managing Peter, Paul and Mary, Wein decided to allow Bob Dylan (whom Grossman was also managing) to close the night. After Peter, Paul and Mary finished their afternoon set, Wein announced that they would reappear at the end of the evening. Dylan performed a set consisting of particularly topical songs: "With God on Our Side", "Talkin' John Birch Society Blues", and "A Hard Rain's Gonna Fall". Peter, Paul and Mary then returned and performed an encore of "Blowin' in the Wind". Amidst a "deafening roar of applause" they brought to the stage Dylan, Joan Baez, Pete Seeger, Theo Bikel and the Freedom Singers. The singers stood in a single line facing the audience with crossed arms and clasped hands and began to sing a variation on the Baptist hymn "I'll Overcome Some Day". The hymn's new incarnation - "We Shall Overcome" - had become an anthem for the Civil Rights Movement.

Revival of Mississippi John Hurt
In 1928, Mississippi John Hurt, a self-taught amateur musician and farmer, recorded 13 songs for Okeh Records which failed to achieve commercial success. Believing his musical career to be over, Hurt continued farming, apparently thinking little of his brief recording gig.

Post WWII, few records cut by southern musicians in the 1920s were commercially available. Hurt's records were particularly rare, since few had been manufactured in the first place. But Harry Smith, a member of a tiny subculture of obsessive, cranky collectors, put two John Hurt cuts on his influential 1952 Anthology of American Folk Music, prompting many blues hobbyists to begin searching for him. In 1963, Tom Hoskins and Mike Stewart acquired a tape of Hurt's Avalon Blues through their informal network of tape traders. Hurt had recorded Avalon Blues at the end of a week-long stay in New York that spanned Christmas 1928. Apparently homesick in the big city, Hurt included a line about his home in Avalon being always on his mind.

Hoskins and Stewart were able to locate Avalon and track Hurt down. After asking Hurt to perform, to ensure he was actually who he claimed to be, Hoskins convinced Hurt to move to Washington D.C. and embark on a national tour.

The tour culminated on Saturday evening of the 1963 Newport Folk Festival, when Mississippi John Hurt performed alongside Brownie McGhee, Sonny Terry and John Lee Hooker for a blues workshop at the Newport Casino. The performance is considered to be a seminal moment for the folk revival and caused Hurt to rise to fame. He performed extensively at colleges, concert halls, and coffeehouses and appeared on The Tonight Show Starring Johnny Carson.

Electric Dylan controversy

Bob Dylan's 1963 and 1964 performances solo and with Baez had made him popular with the Newport crowd, but on July 25, 1965 festival headliner Dylan was booed by some fans when he played with backing band The Paul Butterfield Blues Band.

It is usually said that the reason for the hostile reception by a small number of fans was Dylan's "abandoning" of the folk orthodoxy, or poor sound quality on the night (or a combination of the two). The controversy regarding the reaction of the audience at this event is often overplayed, as it was not the general reaction of the audience, but rather that of a small number of folk "purists", including Pete Seeger. The reaction of "the crowd" to Dylan's performance, certainly from eyewitness accounts, was generally quite enthusiastic. This performance, Dylan's first live "plugged-in" set of his professional career, marked the shift in his artistic direction from folk to rock, and had wider implications for both genres. The performance marked the first time Dylan performed "Like a Rolling Stone" in public.

Despite the musical transition, Dylan's growing status within the larger counterculture ensured that his place in the expanding movement would remain secure.

Dylan did not return to Newport until 2002, when he played a headlining performance while wearing a wig and fake beard.

Johnny Cash Introduces Kris Kristofferson
In 1969, the Johnny Cash troupe was to perform on opening night of the festival. Cash had recently become aware of Kris Kristofferson, a young, relatively unknown country singer-songwriter, and convinced George Wein to allow Kristofferson to join him onstage. Kristofferson's performance of "Me and Bobby McGee" and other songs gave him a launch into his musical career. The 1969 festival also included the debut festival performance of James Taylor, who performed "Carolina in My Mind" to a standing ovation during a "young performers" showcase. However, Taylor only performed for 15 minutes before Wein ended the festival early with the announcement that Apollo 11 had landed on the Moon.

End of Folk Festival, hiatus and return
The Folk Festival did not return to Newport in 1970, due to financial issues and local controversies involving the Newport Jazz Festival. Following a riot at the jazz festival in 1971, Wein deactivated both events. Wein reestablished the Newport Jazz Festival in 1981, and the folk festival returned to town in 1985.

Michelle Shocked V-J Day Protest
The Newport Folk Festival has, throughout various points in its history, remained connected to protest movements. In the 60's the festival played a substantial part in the civil rights movement. In the early 80's the Newport Folk Festival was one of the first festivals to serve as a platform for climate change protest.
 
In the 1990s, playing on Victory Day (originally "Victory over Japan Day" or "V-J Day") folk musician Michelle Shocked asked the entire standing audience to drop to the ground on cue to show what it would look like when crowds died on "Hiroshima Day."  This was relevant to the locale of the festival as Rhode Island is the only US state which still officially celebrates the holiday, and the Naval War College is also in Newport, a mere two miles from the Fort Adams State Park where the festival is held.

Return of Bob Dylan
In 2002, Bob Dylan returned to the Newport Folk Festival for the first time since his shocking performance in 1965, in which he went electric. The '65 appearance at the Folk Festival was a turning point in his career, a distancing of himself from his acoustic folk music to his more blues-based electric music.

Despite wide speculation that Dylan would once again attempt to "shock" the audience at Newport, Dylan performed a straightforward set, with few surprises aside from his adoption of a wig and fake beard. The performance was reviewed favorably and provided a much-needed economic boost to the festival. 
 Dylan has not returned to the Folk Festival since this 2002 performance, but festival organizer Jay Sweet told The Providence Journal in 2016 that Dylan has a standing invitation to play the festival anytime he wants.

Pixies Go Acoustic
Alternative rock band The Pixies recorded an acoustic performance at the Newport Folk Festival in 2005. The set was deemed "Pixies Go Acoustic" as a play on words in reference to Bob Dylan going electric at the Newport Folk Festival in 1965.

The performance was recorded and turned into a feature film directed by Michael B Borofsky, titled Pixies: Acoustic: Live in Newport.

Establishment of Foundation

The Newport Folk Festival has existed in various forms since its creation; founded as a not-for-profit, the festival became a for-profit in the mid-eighties. However, in 2011, the festival announced it would return to its non-profit status under the umbrella of the Newport Festivals Foundation. The Foundation not only strived to sustain the Newport Folk and Newport Jazz Festival, but also expand the impact of its Festivals through educational initiatives that celebrate innovation while preserving the deep traditions inherent in Jazz and Folk music.

Turning Point/50th Celebration
In 2008, Executive Producer, George Wein hired Jay Sweet as an associate of the festival. At the time, the folk festival was struggling financially and with Sweet's recommendations, the 2008 line-up varied drastically from previous years. Rock band the Black Crowes and Trey Anastasio, frontman of Phish, headlined and other artists on the bill included Stephen Marley and Damian Marley, sons of reggae icon Bob Marley. The Festival was well attended and received favorable press, despite folk purists questioning the modernization of the festival.

Sweet continued his unconventional and somewhat controversial style of booking artists that challenged the conservative definitions of folk music. With 2009 being the 50th anniversary of the festival, Sweet used the opportunity to book both modern and traditional folk acts; symbolizing the past and current styles of folk music. The success of the 2009 festival marked a turning point in the festival's history. In 2011 the two day festival sold out Saturday and in 2012 the festival sold out both days. In 2013 the festival expanded to three days and sold out both Saturday and Sunday. In 2014 the festival sold out all three days months in advance. The festival has sold out every year since.

65 Revisited
In commemoration of the 50th anniversary of Bob Dylan going electric at Newport, the Festival scheduled a program titled 65 Revisited on the final night of the 2015 festival. The program's details and performers were kept secret prior to the performance - prompting various rumors including the return of Bob Dylan.

Instead, the program featured an array of more contemporary musicians, including Taylor Goldsmith of Dawes, Gillian Welch and David Rawlings, Willie Watson, Hozier and Klara Soderberg of First Aid Kit, John McCauley and Ian O'Neil of Deer Tick, Robyn Hitchcock and the Preservation Hall Jazz Band of New Orleans. The ensemble performed a collection of Dylan's material, ending the performance with "Rainy Day Women #12 and 35,".

COVID-19 Pandemic
The 2020 edition of the festival was canceled due to the global COVID-19 pandemic. Artists who were scheduled to perform at the festival were invited to return for the 2021 edition.

In March 2021, Rhode Island governor Dan McKee announced that the state was working with the Newport Festivals Foundation to hold the folk and jazz festivals in the summer with modified capacities and a different format. Instead of its typical format, the 2021 Newport Folk Festival was instead formatted as two three-day events in July featuring performances, storytelling and workshops.

2022: Joni Mitchell surprise appearance
The 2022 festival marked a return to normal operations. A highlight was when Brandi Carlile introduced a surprise appearance by Joni Mitchell as the festival's closing act. This was the 78 year old Mitchell's first full-length public performance since the early 2000s and her first appearance at the festival since 1969.

Programming style
In recent years, the Newport Folk Festival has developed a reputation for selling out of tickets before announcing the lineup. Unlike most festivals, the festival "rolls out" their lineup over the course of the year instead of releasing a lineup poster on one day. 
The festival has also developed a reputation for programming surprise, unannounced artists. Past instances include the 65 Revisited program (2015), in which Gillian Welch and Dave Rawlings, Dawes, and Willie Watson appeared unannounced. Other surprise moments include My Morning Jacket (2015), James Taylor (2015), Kris Kristofferson (2016), Roger Waters (2017), Mumford & Sons (2018), Dolly Parton (2019), Paul Simon (2022), and Joni Mitchell (2022).  Like 65 Revisited in 2015, 2018's A Change Is Gonna Come closing set paired guests from the weekend with unannounced guests including Leon Bridges, Chris Thile, and Mavis Staples.

Setting
The Newport Folk Festival takes place every year at Fort Adams State Park, in Newport, Rhode Island. Fort Adams houses four stages, the Fort Stage which sits looking out at Newport harbor and the famous Claiborne Pell Bridge, the Harbor Stage, The Quad Stage, and The Museum Stage. The festival is known for its beautiful setting- as the music blog Consequence of Sound puts it, "Located at the gorgeously scenic Fort Adams, in Newport, Rhode Island, glimmering, clear blue water surrounds the small vivid green peninsula. Look out from the fort towers and you'll see hundreds of beautiful boats rocking along the water." (Consequence of Sound).
My Morning Jacket frontman Jim James told Spin Magazine, "You've got the sun on your skin and the breeze in your hair. It's magical here... It's just magical." (SPIN at Newport Folk 2010) Brandi Carlile says "It's one of my favorites so far if not my favorite." (Brandi Carlile Interview)

WMVY began streaming the festival in 2005 and was joined by NPR Music in 2008. WMVY's Archives contains both performances and interviews from Newport Folk and NPR music has recorded sets available for listening here: NPR at Newport Folk 2010.

Sustainability
The festival has made efforts in being green-friendly, teaming with many groups to do so.
They partnered with Clean Water Action and Rhode Island Resource Recovery to collect 1.5 tons of recyclables. CWA worked onsite picking up trash and recycling, and set up composting stations to curb the waste generated during the event. A portion of beer and wine sales went to CWA to support their work.
The official beer of the festival, Vermont-based Magic Hat used plant-based, 100% compostable cups.
The festival also partnered with CLIF Bar, who set up a bike valet to encourage people to cycle to the event and participate in their 2-Mile Challenge.
They worked with New England Wind Fund to offset power used during the festival, and Klean Kanteen to provide reusable water bottles.
They also partnered with Farm Fresh Rhode Island to incorporate local foods into the vendors' fare.

Awards
 In 2015, the Newport Folk Festival was named Music Festival of the Year by Consequence of Sound.
 In 2012, the Newport Folk Festival was named Music Festival of Year by Pollstar. 
 In 2014, the Newport Folk Festival was named Music Festival of Year by Pollstar. 
 In 2015, the Newport Folk Festival was named Music Festival of Year by Pollstar.

Albums recorded at the festival
 The Newport Folk Festival, 1959 [3 Volumes] - Vanguard Records
 The Kingston Trio Live at Newport - Vanguard Records (1959 performance released in 1994)
 The Newport Folk Festival, 1960 [2 Volumes] - Vanguard Records
 The Folk Lore of John Lee Hooker (Vee-Jay 1961) - features two tracks recorded at 1960 Festival
 Live at Newport - Phil Ochs (Compilation from '63, '64, '66)

Albums issued by Vanguard Records after the 1963 Newport Folk Festival
 Newport Broadside (Topical Songs) - VRS-9144 (Mono) and VSD-79144 (Stereo) Joan Baez, Bob Davenport, Bob Dylan, The Freedom Singers, Jim Garland, Sam Hinton, Peter La Farge, Ed McCurdy, Phil Ochs, Tom Paxton, Pete Seeger
 Blues at Newport - VRS-9145 (Mono) and VS-79145 (Stereo) Rev. Gary Davis, John Hammond, John Lee Hooker, Brownie McGhee and Sonny Terry, Mississippi John Hurt
 Country Music and Bluegrass At Newport - VRS-9146 (Mono) and VSD-79146 (Stereo) Clarence "Tom" Ashley, Clint Howard, Jim and Jesse and the Virginia Boys, Tex Logan, The Morris Brothers, The New Lost City Ramblers, Fred Price, Doc Watson, Mac Wiseman, and The Country Boys.
 Old Time Music At Newport - VRS-9147 (Mono) and VSD-79147 (Stereo) Clarence "Tom" Ashley, Doc Boggs, Maybelle Carter, Jenes Cottrell, Dorsey Dixon, Clint Howard, Fred Price, Doc Watson
 The Newport Folk Festival 1963 - The Evening Concerts: Vol. 1 - VRS-9148 (Mono) and VSD-79148 (Stereo)
 The Newport Folk Festival 1963 - The Evening Concerts: Vol. 2 - VRS-9149 (Mono) and VSD-79149 (Stereo)
 Live at Newport (John Lee Hooker album)

Albums issued by Vanguard Records after the 1964 Newport Folk Festival
 The Newport Folk Festival 1964 - Evening Concerts: Vol. 1 - VRS-9184 (Mono) and VSD-79184 (Stereo)
 The Newport Folk Festival 1964 - Evening Concerts: Vol. 2 - VRS-9185 (Mono) and VSD-79185 (Stereo)
 Long Journey Home - VCD-77004 (Stereo) The Kentucky Colonels (Clarence White, Roland White, Billy Ray Lathum, and Roger Bush) with Doc Watson and Bill Keith
 Festival: The Newport Folk Festival 1965
 Ben & Jerry's Newport Folk Festival '88 Live
 Ben & Jerry's Newport Folk Festival, Vol. 2 (1990)
 Turn of the Decade 1989-90: Ben & Jerry's Newport Folk Festival []

Festival lineups
Notable past performers at the Newport Folk Festival include:

First incarnation (1959-1969)
 1959: The Kingston Trio, Pete Seeger, Bob Gibson with Joan Baez, Odetta, Earl Scruggs, Jean Ritchie, The New Lost City Ramblers, Bo Diddley, Reverend Gary Davis, Barbara Dane, Brownie McGhee and Sonny Terry, John Jacob Niles, Tommy Makem, Oscar Brand, Ed McCurdy, Cynthia Gooding, Leon Bibb, Martha Schlamme, The Stanley Brothers.
 1960:  Pete Seeger, The New Lost City Ramblers, John Lee Hooker, Lester Flatt and Earl Scruggs, Peggy Seeger, Ewan MacColl, Bob Gibson, Jimmy Driftwood, Ed McCurdy, Tommy Makem, Cisco Houston, Bill Lee, Theodore Bikel, Jean Carignan, Alan Mills.
 1961: No festival.
 1962: No festival.
 1963: Bob Dylan, Judy Collins, Joan Baez, Freedom Singers, Peter, Paul & Mary, Pete Seeger, Ramblin' Jack Elliott, John Lee Hooker, Doc Watson, Mississippi John Hurt, Brownie McGhee and Sonny Terry, Clarence Ashley, John Hammond, Dave Van Ronk, Reverend Gary Davis, Bill Monroe, Jim & Jesse.
 1964: Bob Dylan, Jose Feliciano, Joan Baez, Judy Collins, Pete Seeger, Johnny Cash, Peter, Paul & Mary, Phil Ochs, Theodore Bikel, The Stanley Brothers, The Staple Singers, Jesse Fuller, Robert Pete Williams.
 1965: Bob Dylan, The Paul Butterfield Blues Band, Joan Baez with Donovan, Peter, Paul & Mary, Gordon Lightfoot, Maybelle Carter, Pete Seeger, Memphis Slim and Willie Dixon, Oscar Brand, Richard and Mimi Fariña, Reverend Gary Davis, Son House, The New Lost City Ramblers, Theodore Bikel, Lightnin' Hopkins, Jean Ritchie, The Chambers Brothers, Hamilton Camp, Ian & Sylvia, Bill Monroe.
 1966: Chuck Berry, Richie Havens, Judy Collins, Lester Flatt and Earl Scruggs, Pete Seeger, The Lovin Spoonful, Phil Ochs, Tom Paxton, Ramblin' Jack Elliott, Skip James, Bukka White, Son House, Dixie Hummingbirds, Dorothy Love Coates & The Original Gospel Harmonettes, The Swan Silvertones, Hazel Dickens & Alice Gerrard, Jim & Jesse.
 1967: Muddy Waters, Joan Baez, Judy Collins, Joni Mitchell, Leonard Cohen, The Chambers Brothers, Arlo Guthrie, Maybelle Carter, Janis Ian, Mimi Fariña, The Staple Singers, The Incredible String Band, Jean Ritchie, Gordon Lightfoot, Sister Rosetta Tharpe, Theodore Bikel, Buffy Sainte-Marie, Dave Dudley, Merle Travis, Grandpa Jones.
 1968: Big Brother and the Holding Company, Richie Havens, Joan Baez, Buddy Guy and Junior Wells, B.B. King, Joni Mitchell, Arlo Guthrie, Taj Mahal, Ralph Stanley, Elizabeth Cotten, Roy Acuff, Theodore Bikel, Tim Buckley, George Hamilton IV, Jerry Merrick, Janis Ian, Buell Kazee, Eric Von Schmidt, Doc Watson, Mimi Fariña, Jim Kweskin, Fred McDowell, Joe Heaney, Ramblin' Jack Elliott, John Hartford, The Young Tradition, Frederick Douglass Kirkpatrick, Pete Seeger, Bread and Puppet Theater.
 1969: Johnny Cash with June Carter and Kris Kristofferson, Carl Perkins and The Tennessee Three, Big Mama Thornton, The Everly Brothers, Buffy Sainte-Marie, James Taylor (performance interrupted after 15 minutes), Arlo Guthrie, Muddy Waters, Joni Mitchell, Taj Mahal (did not show), Van Morrison, Pete Seeger, Pentangle, Jesse Fuller, Buddy Moss and Brownie McGhee, Ramblin' Jack Elliott, Son House, Sleepy John Estes, Jerry Jeff Walker.

Second incarnation (1985-2010)
 1985: Joan Baez, Arlo Guthrie, Bonnie Raitt, Judy Collins, Taj Mahal, Ramblin' Jack Elliott, Merle Watson, Tom Paxton, Dave Van Ronk, Peter Rowan, Mimi Fariña, New Grass Revival.
 1986: Odetta, Tom Rush, Kate & Anna McGarrigle, Richie Havens, Patty Larkin, Alison Krauss, John Sebastian, Sweet Honey in the Rock, Nanci Griffith, Bill Staines.
 1987: Arlo Guthrie, Joan Baez, Judy Collins, Tom Paxton, Bonnie Raitt, Johnny Copeland, Billy Bragg, Alison Krauss, The Bobs, Katie Webster, Maria and Geoff Muldaur, John Sebastian, Patty Larkin, John Hammond, New Grass Revival.
 1988: Los Lobos, Robert Cray Band, Richard Thompson, Taj Mahal, Dr. John, Buffy Sainte-Marie, Tom Paxton, Shawn Colvin, Queen Ida, Artie and Happy Traum, Doc Watson, Cheryl Wheeler, Patty Larkin.
 1989: Pete Seeger, Emmylou Harris, Odetta, B.B. King, Ry Cooder, Leon Redbone, The Clancy Brothers, John Lee Hooker, Theodore Bikel, John Prine, John Hiatt, Buckwheat Zydeco, Laura Nyro, Shawn Colvin, Cheryl Wheeler, Chris Smither.
 1990: Joan Baez, Indigo Girls, Richard Thompson, The Roches, Michelle Shocked with Tower of Power, Ry Cooder and David Lindley, Ladysmith Black Mambazo, Robert Earl Keen, Luka Bloom, Flaco Jiménez, The Wild Magnolias with Rebirth Brass Band, Chris Smither, Sweet Honey in the Rock, Christine Lavin.
 1991: John Prine, Randy Newman, Indigo Girls, Richard Thompson, Nanci Griffith, Suzanne Vega, Mary Chapin Carpenter, Kate & Anna McGarrigle, The Staple Singers, John Hiatt, Shawn Colvin.
 1992: Four Voices in Harmony (Joan Baez, Mary Chapin Carpenter and Indigo Girls), Loudon Wainwright III, The Band, Bruce Cockburn, Mary Chapin Carpenter, Suzanne Vega, Iris DeMent, Shawn Colvin, Patty Larkin, David Wilcox.
 1993: The Band, Peter, Paul & Mary, Mary Chapin Carpenter, John Prine, Indigo Girls, Joan Baez, Alison Krauss & Union Station, Sarah McLachlan, Nanci Griffith, Daniel Lanois, Sweet Honey in the Rock.
 1994: Sarah McLachlan, Indigo Girls, Richard Thompson, Fairport Convention, Randy Newman, Arlo Guthrie, Dar Williams, Michelle Shocked, Iris DeMent.
 1995: Joan Baez, Mary Chapin Carpenter, Indigo Girls, Bill Morrissey, Keb' Mo', John Hiatt, The Jayhawks, Ani DiFranco, Victoria Williams, Wilco, Bob Weir and Rob Wasserman, Mary Black, Patty Larkin, Cheryl Wheeler, Luka Bloom.
 1996: Indigo Girls, Bruce Cockburn, Lisa Loeb, Ani DiFranco, Joan Armatrading, John Hiatt, Michelle Shocked, Suzanne Vega, John Gorka, Patty Larkin, Cheryl Wheeler, Peter Rowan, Jerry Douglas, Clarence "Gatemouth" Brown, Cordelia's Dad, David Wilcox, Maura O'Connell.
 1997: James Taylor, Little Feat, Joan Baez, John Hiatt, Janis Ian, Violent Femmes, Rosanne Cash, Dar Williams, Richard Shindell, Gillian Welch, Mary Black, Moxy Früvous, Jonatha Brooke.
 1998:  Lyle Lovett, Joan Baez, Violent Femmes, Lucinda Williams, Loudon Wainwright III, Marc Cohn, Béla Fleck, Trina Hamlin, Rodney Crowell, David Bromberg.
 1998 Travelling Festival: Rotating lineup that included some or all of the acts above plus The Staple Singers, Wilco, Rickie Lee Jones, John Hiatt, Nanci Griffith, Leo Kottke, Mark Eitzel, Jimmie Dale Gilmore.
 1999: Joan Armatrading, Wilco, Indigo Girls, Suzanne Vega, Steve Earle, Ladysmith Black Mambazo, Beth Orton, Susan Tedeschi, Robert Earl Keen, Cry Cry Cry, Patty Griffin, Lori McKenna, Mary Black, Stacey Earle, Ray Wylie Hubbard.
 2000: Willie Nelson, Béla Fleck and the Flecktones, Natalie Merchant, Shawn Colvin, Guy Clark, The String Cheese Incident, Mary Chapin Carpenter, Richard Shindell, Dar Williams, Lucy Kaplansky, Cheryl Wheeler, John Gorka, Stacey Earle, Peter Rowan.
 2001: Emmylou Harris, Indigo Girls, David Rawlings and Gillian Welch, Joan Osborne, Mike Doughty, Michelle Shocked, Kelly Willis, Mary Lou Lord, Patty Larkin,  David Johansen, Victoria Williams and Mark Olson, North Mississippi Allstars with Robert Randolph and John Medeski, The Flatlanders, Jonatha Brooke, Susan McKeown.
 2002: Bob Dylan, Shawn Colvin, Arlo Guthrie, Dar Williams, Bruce Cockburn, Richard Shindell, The Blind Boys of Alabama, Kate and Anna McGarrigle, John Gorka, Maura O'Connell, The Waifs.
 2003: Lyle Lovett, Aimee Mann, John Hiatt, Ani DiFranco, John Prine, Joan Armatrading, Keb' Mo', Angélique Kidjo, Sarah Lee Guthrie & Johnny Irion, Guy Clark and Joe Ely, Ellis Paul.
 2004: Crosby, Stills & Nash, Steve Earle, Lucinda Williams, Wilco, Rufus Wainwright with Kate McGarrigle, Joan Osborne, Doc Watson, Old Crow Medicine Show, The Dixie Hummingbirds, Garth Hudson and Levon Helm, Lori McKenna, Ron Sexsmith, Mindy Smith, Corey Harris, Laura Cantrell.
 2005: Pixies, Elvis Costello and The Imposters, Emmylou Harris, Bright Eyes, Richard Thompson, Odetta, Arlo Guthrie, M. Ward, Jim James, Ray LaMontagne, Patty Griffin, Del McCoury, Teddy Thompson, Old Crow Medicine Show, Béla Fleck, Sarah Lee Guthrie & Johnny Irion, Jane Siberry, Kaki King, Buddy Miller, Jim Lauderdale.
 2006: David Gray, Indigo Girls, Odetta, Rosanne Cash, David Rawlings and Gillian Welch, Grace Potter and the Nocturnals, Chris Smither, Bettye LaVette, The Meters, Rosalie Sorrels, Sonny Landreth, Keller Williams, The Wood Brothers, Patty Larkin, Ronan Tynan, Cherish the Ladies.
 2007: The Allman Brothers Band, Linda Rondstadt, Emmylou Harris, Alison Krauss & Union Station, Ralph Stanley, John Butler Trio, Martha Wainwright, Grace Potter and the Nocturnals, Alejandro Escovedo, Carolina Chocolate Drops, Cheryl Wheeler, The Nightwatchman, Amos Lee, Elvis Perkins.
 2008: Brian Wilson, Jimmy Buffett, The Black Crowes, Levon Helm, The Avett Brothers, Cat Power, Jim James, She & Him, Brandi Carlile, Trey Anastasio, Jakob Dylan, Steve Earle and Allison Moorer, Stephen and Damian Marley, Richie Havens, Gillian Welch, Calexico, Jesca Hoop, Kaki King, Son Volt, Young@Heart Chorus, Cowboy Junkies.
 2009: Pete Seeger, Judy Collins, The Decemberists, Fleet Foxes, Joan Baez, Arlo Guthrie, Gillian Welch, Billy Bragg, Iron & Wine, Ramblin' Jack Elliott, Neko Case, Mavis Staples, The Nightwatchman, The Low Anthem, Ben Kweller, Deer Tick, Del McCoury, Langhorne Slim, Elvis Perkins, Brett Dennen, Josh Ritter.
 2010: Steve Martin and the Steep Canyon Rangers, John Prine, Jim James, Andrew Bird, Brandi Carlile, The Swell Season, Levon Helm, Richie Havens, Sharon Jones & the Dap-Kings, Punch Brothers, Sarah Jarosz, Calexico, The Low Anthem, Blitzen Trapper, Justin Townes Earle, Edward Sharpe and the Magnetic Zeroes, Doc Watson and David Holt, Preservation Hall Jazz Band, O'Death, Pokey LaFarge.

Third, non-profit incarnation (2011-present)
 2011: The Decemberists, Emmylou Harris, Elvis Costello, Gillian Welch, Tegan and Sara, Mavis Staples, Earl Scruggs, M. Ward, Gogol Bordello, Ramblin' Jack Elliott, Wanda Jackson, The Civil Wars, Carolina Chocolate Drops, The Head and the Heart, Delta Spirit, Pokey LaFarge, Justin Townes Earle, Trampled by Turtles, PS22 Chorus, Amos Lee, The Secret Sisters, Freelance Whales, The Felice Brothers, The Devil Makes Three, Dar Williams, John Gorka, Brown Bird, David Wax Museum, Middle Brother.
 2012: My Morning Jacket, Jackson Browne, Conor Oberst, Iron & Wine, Patty Griffin, Arlo Guthrie, Alabama Shakes, The Head and the Heart, Deer Tick,  Charles Bradley, Tune-Yards, Of Monsters and Men, Sharon Van Etten, Dawes, Preservation Hall Jazz Band, Gary Clark Jr., Punch Brothers, City and Colour, Spirit Family Reunion, The Tallest Man on Earth, Sara Watkins, First Aid Kit, Tom Morello, Brown Bird, Elizabeth Mitchell, Trampled by Turtles.
 2013: Beck, The Avett Brothers, Feist, Jim James, Colin Meloy, Andrew Bird, The Mountain Goats, The Lumineers, Father John Misty, Bonnie "Prince" Billy and Dawn McCarthy, Jason Isbell, Amanda Palmer, Old Crow Medicine Show, Justin Townes Earle, The Felice Brothers, Beth Orton, Frank Turner, Langhorne Slim, The Low Anthem, Lord Huron, Trombone Shorty, Iris DeMent, Sarah Jarosz, Hurray for the Riff Raff, Shovels & Rope, Phosphorescent, Elizabeth Mitchell, JD McPherson, The Milk Carton Kids, Black Prairie, Houndmouth.
 2014: Jack White, Ryan Adams, Band of Horses, Jimmy Cliff, Mavis Staples, Jeff Tweedy, Jenny Lewis, Sun Kil Moon, Nickel Creek, Kurt Vile, Conor Oberst, Rodrigo y Gabriela, Robert Hunter, The Devil Makes Three, Lake Street Dive, Deer Tick, Shovels & Rope, Dawes, Anaïs Mitchell, Lucius, J Roddy Walston and the Business, Hurray for the Riff Raff, John C. Reilly, Hozier, Shakey Graves, Thao & The Get Down Stay Down, Lucero, Valerie June, Reignwolf, Benjamin Booker, Pegi Young, Pokey LaFarge, Aoife O'Donovan, Houndmouth, The Haden Triplets.
 2015: Roger Waters, James Taylor, The Decemberists, My Morning Jacket, Leon Bridges, Hozier, Sturgill Simpson, Sufjan Stevens, Iron & Wine and Ben Bridwell, Jason Isbell, Brandi Carlile, Courtney Barnett, Laura Marling, Béla Fleck and Abigail Washburn, Nathaniel Rateliff and the Night Sweats, J Mascis, Jon Batiste, Langhorne Slim, Robyn Hitchcock, Preservation Hall Jazz Band, Lord Huron, First Aid Kit, Calexico, Brian Fallon, Angel Olsen, Tommy Stinson, Hiss Golden Messenger, Shakey Graves, José González, The Lone Bellow, The Felice Brothers, Madisen Ward and the Mama Bear, Spirit Family Reunion, The Tallest Man on Earth, Joe Pug.
 2016:  Patti Smith, Elvis Costello, Norah Jones, Alabama Shakes, Ryan Adams, Flight of the Conchords, Graham Nash, Father John Misty, case/lang/veirs, Margo Price, Nathaniel Rateliff and the Night Sweats, Violent Femmes, Ray LaMontagne, Frightened Rabbit, Rayland Baxter, Glen Hansard, Del McCoury and David Grisman, The Texas Gentlemen with Joe Ely and Kris Kristofferson, The Arcs, The Strumbellas, John Moreland, Edward Sharpe and the Magnetic Zeros, Aoife O'Donovan, Julien Baker, Brian Fallon, Preservation Hall Jazz Band, Basia Bulat, Brett Dennen, Fruit Bats, Raury, Ruby Amanfu, River Whyless, Songhoy Blues, Lady Lamb, Middle Brother.
 2017: Wilco, Fleet Foxes, Regina Spektor, John Prine with Roger Waters and Lucius, Jim James, Drive-By Truckers, Ben Gibbard, The Avett Brothers, Offa Rex (The Decemberists with Olivia Chaney), Billy Bragg and Joe Henry, Rhiannon Giddens, Suzanne Vega, Grandma's Hands Band (Justin Vernon with Natalie Prass, Patterson Hood, and Hiss Golden Messenger), Angel Olsen, Dr. Dog, Hurray For the Riff Raff, Chicano Batman, Margaret Glaspy, Shovels & Rope, Pinegrove, Whitney, I'm With Her, John Paul White, Big Thief, Mandolin Orange, Michael Kiwanuka, Julia Jacklin.
 2018: Mumford & Sons, Sturgill Simpson, Jason Isbell & The 400 Unit with David Crosby, Jon Batiste and The Dap-Kings, St. Vincent, Margo Price, Cheech & Chong, Courtney Barnett, Ben Harper and Charlie Musselwhite, Brandi Carlile, Jenny Lewis, Glen Hansard, Gary Clark Jr., Passenger, Lucius, Langhorne Slim, Nels Cline, Hamilton Leithauser and Rostam, Phoebe Bridgers, Lukas Nelson & Promise of the Real,  Toots and the Maytals, Nicole Atkins, Fantastic Negrito, Low Cut Connie, Valerie June, The Lone Bellow, Preservation Hall Jazz Band, Amanda Shires, Hiss Golden Messenger, JD McPherson, Shakey Graves, Moses Sumney, Tank and the Bangas, Jen Cloher, Tuck & Patti, This Is the Kit, Curtis Harding.
 2019: Dolly Parton, Kacey Musgraves, Trey Anastasio, Sheryl Crow, Portugal. The Man, Kermit the Frog with Jim James and Janet Weiss, Phil Lesh, Jeff Tweedy, Amy Ray, Hozier, Judy Collins, Maggie Rogers, Stephen Marley, Lucy Dacus, Dawes, Lukas Nelson & Promise of the Real, Haley Heynderickx, Lake Street Dive, Preservation Hall Jazz Band, Noname, Ramblin' Jack Elliott, Benmont Tench, Cedric Burnside, I'm with Her, Todd Snider, Courtney Marie Andrews, Warren Haynes, Gregory Alan Isakov, The Highwomen, Bonny Light Horseman (Anaïs Mitchell, Eric D. Johnson, and Josh Kaufman), Our Native Daughters (Rhiannon Giddens, Allison Russell, Leyla McCalla, and Amythyst Kiah), The Infamous Stringdusters, The Milk Carton Kids, Parker Millsap, Liz Cooper & The Stampede, Kevin Morby, Mountain Man, John Cohen, Phosphorescent, Billy Strings and Molly Tuttle, Adia Victoria, Jade Bird, Susto, Alice Gerrard, Jupiter & Okwess, Charley Crockett, Yola, Rayland Baxter, J.S. Ondara, Nilüfer Yanya, The Down Hill Strugglers, Ari Hest, Angie McMahon, Erin Rae.
 2020 Event canceled due to the COVID-19 pandemic. 
 Lineup prior to cancelation included The National, Randy Newman, Drive-By Truckers, Big Thief, Son Volt, Brittany Howard, Waxahatchee, Nathaniel Rateliff, Phoebe Bridgers, Andrew Bird, Sharon Van Etten, Grace Potter, Ed O'Brien, Mandy Moore with Taylor Goldsmith and Mike Viola, Sylvan Esso, Black Pumas, The Secret Sisters, Watkins Family Hour, Preservation Hall Jazz Band, Sampa the Great, Yola, Alexi Murdoch, Delta Spirit, Rainbow Kitten Surprise, Daughter of Swords, Puss n Boots, Vagabon, Mandolin Orange, The Marcus King Band, Lee Fields, Caamp, Ian Noe, Steve Gunn and William Tyler, Early James, Joseph, Sunny War.
 2021: Beck, Randy Newman, Waxahatchee, Nathaniel Rateliff and the Night Sweats, Allison Russell with Chaka Khan and Amythyst Kiah, Margo Price, Lucy Dacus, Brothers of a Feather (Chris and Rich Robinson) Ben Gibbard, Bleachers, Grace Potter, Deer Tick, Lake Street Dive, Sharon Van Etten, Dimmer Twins (Mike Cooley and Patterson Hood), Yola with Brandi Carlile, Julien Baker, Fred Armisen, Chris Thile, Shakey Graves, Langhorne Slim, Courtney Marie Andrews, Bonny Light Horseman, Watchhouse, Joy Oladokun, Middle Brother, Erin Rae with Haley Heynderickx and MC Taylor, Vagabon, Hiss Golden Messenger, Billy Strings, Andrew Bird and Jimbo Mathus, Kevin Morby, The Marcus King Band, Devon Gilfillian, Fruit Bats, Aoife O'Donovan, Natalie Hemby, Black Joe Lewis, Steve Gunn, Emma Swift, Caamp, Jonathan Russell, Early James, Katie Pruitt, S.G. Goodman, Yasmin Williams, Celisse, Ida Mae, Sunny War, Tré Burt, Resistance Revival Chorus.
 2022: Brandi Carlile with Joni Mitchell, The National, The Roots, Japanese Breakfast, Maren Morris, Lucy Dacus, Dinosaur Jr., Béla Fleck with Sam Bush and Jerry Douglas, Bleachers, Courtney Barnett, Anaïs Mitchell, Lucius, Valerie June, Clairo, American Tune Review (Nathaniel Rateliff and the Night Sweats with Paul Simon, Natalie Merchant, Adia Victoria, Lee Fields, The Silk Road Ensemble, Lukas Nelson, Marcus Mumford, Lucius, Midlake, and Courtney Marie Andrews) Sylvan Esso, Taj Mahal, Hurray for the Riff Raff, Midlake, Taylor Goldsmith, The Felice Brothers, John Moreland, Arooj Aftab, Joy Oladokun, The Silk Road Ensemble with Rhiannon Giddens, Langhorne Slim, Cassandra Jenkins, Black Opry Revue, Goose, The Linda Lindas, Lee Fields, Adia Victoria, Blake Mills, Phil Cook's Love Will Go All the Way: A Spiritual Helpline Gospel Revue, Carm, Hannah Georgas, DakhaBrakha, John Craigie, Madi Diaz, Skullcrusher, Sierra Ferrell, Faye Webster, Hermanos Gutiérrez, Neal Francis, The Dead Tongues, The Ballroom Thieves, Árný Margrét, The Backseat Lovers, Bendigo Fletcher, The A's (Amelia Meath and Alexandra Sauser-Monnig), Buffalo Nichols, Leith Ross.
 2023 (rolling lineup announcements in progress): Billy Strings, Jonathan Richman, Orville Peck, Mdou Moctar, The Beths, Bartees Strange, Nanna, Caamp, Jupiter & Okwess, Abraham Alexander, The Backseat Lovers.

See also
American folk music revival
Festival!, 1967 film
No Direction Home, 2005 Martin Scorsese documentary on Bob Dylan
Kerrville Folk Festival
Philadelphia Folk Festival
Newport Music Festival

References

Further reading 
 Massimo, Rick. I Got a Song: A History of the Newport Folk Festival (2017). Wesleyan University Press. 
 Reed, James, "Founder pitches to again lead Newport fests: Promoter's financial woes prompt return of George Wein", The Boston Globe, March 4, 2009 (archived 2009)

External links

 
 Festival Network
 The Fariña Files: about the early 1960s Newport Folk Festivals
 Newport Folk Festival discography
 Newport Folk Festival webcasts at NPR Music
 Well-Rounded Radio's 2009 audio interview with Co-Producer Jay Sweet
 Well-Rounded Radio's 2010 audio interview with Founder + Producer George Wein

Music festivals in Rhode Island
Folk festivals in the United States
Folk Festival
Music festivals established in 1959
Performing arts in Rhode Island
1959 establishments in Rhode Island